An Afghan training camp is a term used to describe a camp or facility used for militant training located in the central Asian country of Afghanistan, especially those where members of the Al-Qaeda terrorist group trained (although are not exclusive to any one group). At the time of the September 11, 2001 attacks, Indian intelligence officials estimated that there were over 120 training camps operating in Afghanistan and Pakistan, run by a variety of militant groups as well as the intelligence service of Pakistan.

During the Afghan Civil War, the country was in an anarchist state which attracted international terrorists in the 1990s, especially Al-Qaeda and various other groups like Jaish-e-Mohammed. These camps would eventually be used for training jihadists who would fight in various places including Kashmir, Chechnya, Bosnia, the Philippines, Palestine, and Xinjiang (China).

In 2002, journalists with The New York Times examined the sites of several former training camps, finding 5,000 documents.
According to The New York Times:

On July 25, 2007, scholars at the Combating Terrorism Center at the United States Military Academy published a study that named over two dozen training camps allegedly attended by Guantanamo captives. In the al-Qaeda document, Military Studies in the Jihad Against Tyrants, a series of rules for training camps were laid out.

History

Afghan training camps have been functioning for decades. It is believed that several thousand camps were established throughout Afghanistan in the 1980s during the Soviet-Afghan War. These camps have historically not only provided militant and physical training but also an extensive training and devotion to Islamic history and faith.

Training was also originally provided by seasoned veterans of other armed forces around the world. For example, Osama bin Laden once opened a camp for non-Afghan fighters that was led by two former Egyptian servicemen.

Curriculum

While in attendance at these camps, the majority of the recruits’ work revolves around physical training and spiritual devotion. While physical training is important to some operations, theology seems to be the most important task during training. Recruits are asked to memorize sacred texts and engage in prayer throughout the day's activities.

Recruits also learn to operate weapons, how to produce explosives and poisons, vehicle driving and maintenance, basic engineering, farming and urban guerilla tactics. In addition to these trainings recruits are also subject to mazes, obstacle courses, trenches, and classroom lectures.

Admission to camps

According to captured documents, there are guidelines that recruits must satisfy before entering the camp. First, trainees are screened. They are evaluated on ethnicity, their devotion, and their willingness to fight. One entrance form states that recruits must leave behind all valuables, not prepare food while in the camp, obey regulations, and certify that they are in good health for training. The entrance form also asks recruits about their prior military and combat experience.

Secrecy is of the utmost importance, so it is common for the recruits inside the camp to not to know fellow recruits’ or instructors’ names. In most cases, the recruits at these camps do not actually know the location of their camp. Trainees are also always kept in small groups of 7 to 10. Camps are also generally located in a desolate area, suitable for militant training, and physical training. One document also notes the camps usually have few entrances and exits.

Known locations of Afghan training camps

See also
Terrorist training camp

References

Terrorism in Afghanistan
Afghan training camps